Victoria Vita Polevá (also spelled: Poleváya; ; ; born September 11, 1962) is a Ukrainian composer.

Biography
Born on September 11, 1962 in Kiev, Ukraine, daughter of composer Valery Polevoy (1927–1986). Graduate of Kiev Conservatory (class of composition with Prof. Ivan Karabyts) 1989. Post-graduate studies completed there in 1995 under Prof. Levko Kolodub. 1990-1998 - lecturer in the faculty of composition, 2000-2005 – at the Music Information Technologies Department of the Kiev Conservatory. Since 2005 she has been a freelance composer. 2014, 2015 - member of the jury of the International Composers Competition "Sacrarium" (Italy)

A genre range of her compositions includes symphonic, choral, chamber music. Early works of Victoria Polevá were related to the aesthetics of the avant-garde and polystylistics (ballet "Gagaku", "Transform" for symphony orchestra, "Anthem" for chamber orchestra,  "Еpiphany" for chamber ensemble, cantatas "Horace's ode", "Gentle light"). From the late 1990s her music became identified stylistically with "sacred minimalism" (A. Pärt, P. Vasks, J. Tavener, H. Gorecki). An important period in Victoria Polevá's creative work is related to intensive studies and embodiment of texts from divine services in the music.

Victoria Polevá's works are performed at the Beethovenfest Bonn (Germany), the Lockenhaus Chamber Music Festival (Austria), the Yuri Bashmet Festival in Minsk (Belarus), the Valery Gergiev Easter Festival in Moscow (Russia), Chamber Music Connects the World (Kronberg, Germany), the Dresdner Musikfestspiele, the Philharmonie Berlin, the Köln Philharmonie (Germany), the Theatre de Chatelet in Paris (France), the Rudolfinum-Dvorak Hall in Prague (Czech Republic), the Auditorio Nacional de España in Madrid (Spain), the George Weston Recital Hall in Toronto (Canada), the Yerba Buena Theater in San Francisco (United States), the Oriental Art Center in Shanghai (China), the Seoul Art Center (South Korea), the Esplanade Concert Hall in Singapore, and at festivals of new music in Ukraine, Sweden, Finland, Switzerland, Italy, Poland, United Arab Emirates, Peru and Chile.

In 2006 Victoria Polevá was composer-in-residence at the Menhir Chamber Music Festival (Swiss, Graubunden).

In 2010, among such composers as Giya Kancheli, Valentin Silvestrov, Leonid Desyatnikov, Aleksander Raskatov, Alexander Wustin, Victor Kissine and Georgs Pelecis, Victoria Polevá has taken part in Gidon Kremer's international project «The Art of Instrumentation», devoted to Johann Sebastian Bach and Glenn Gould.

In 2011 Victoria Polevá was invited by Gidon Kremer as composer-in-residence at the XXX Lockenhaus Chamber Music Festival (Austria).

In 2012 a butoh dancer Tadashi Endo did premiere of her ballet "Gagaku".
 
In 2013 Kronos Quartet did premiere of V.Polevá "Walking on Waters".

In 2013 Victoria Polevá was composer-in-residence at Festival of Contemporary Music Darwin Vargas (Chile, Valparaiso)

Among the performers of her works are: 
Gidon Kremer (violin), Andrei Pushkarev (vibraphone), Aleksei Ogrintchouk (oboe), Elsbeth Moser (accordion), Chamber orchestra "Kremerata Baltica", Giedre Dirvanauskaite, Natalka Polovinka(voice), Chamber trio "CAT", ensembles "New music in Ukraine", "Ricochet", strings quartets "Harmony of the world", "Archi", duet "Violoncellissimo" (Ukraine), Moscow Contemporary Music Ensemble (Russia), "Atros-trio", "Avalon-trio", "Zurich Ensemble for New Music" (Switzerland), "Accroche note" (France)
conductors Volodymyr Sirenko, Roman Kofman, Arild Remmereit, Valery Matyukhin, Bohodar Kotorovych, Viktor Ploskina, Volodymyr Runchak, Petro Tovstukha, Ihor Andriivskiy, Natalia Ponomarchuk, Simon Camartin;
choral conductors Iryna Sablina, Marianna Sablina, Halyna Horbatenko, Mykola Hobdych, Volodymyr Syvohip, Dmytro Radyk, Larysa Bouhonska, Natalia Krechko, Oksana Mykytiuk, Olena Radko, Bohdan Plish, Alena Solovey, Boris Alvarado.

Victoria Poleva is a Laureate of the Municipal Prize "Kyiv" in honour of Artemy Vedel (2013), winner of «Spherical Music» international competition (USA, 2008), a Laureate of the Prize of the Ministry of Culture and Tourism of Ukraine instituted in honour of Borys Lyatoshynsky (2005), a Winner of the All-Ukrainian Competition "Psalms of the Third Millennium" (2001, 1st prize), a Laureate of the Prize of the Ministry of Culture and Arts of Ukraine instituted in honour of Levko Revutsky (1995).

Since 2006 the Swiss agency "Sordino Ediziuns Musicalas" has been publishing her works.

Works

Stage
 2021 "Mirror, Dreams or Little Life", ballet for chamber orchestra
 2020 "Boundless Island", chamber opera for three voices and chamber ensemble
 2012-1986 "Ars Moriendi" ("The Art of Dying") mono-opera for soprano and piano
 1994 "Gagaku", ballet on the story "Hell Screen" by Ryūnosuke Akutagawa for chamber orchestra: 38'

Symphony orchestra
 2022 "Nova" for symphony orchestra
 2020 "Didu" for symphony orchestra
 2006 "Null" for symphony orchestra: 18'
 2004 "Nenia" for violin and symphony orchestra: 13'
 2004 "ONO" for symphony orchestra: 17'
 2003 Symphony No. 3 ("White interment"), version for symphony orchestra: 14'
 1993 "Transform", diptych for ensemble of soloists and symphony orchestra: 31'
 1992 "Langsam" for symphony orchestra (edit. 2009): 18'
 1990 Symphony No. 2 ("Offertory to Anton Bruckner") for symphony orchestra: 20'
 1988 Symphony No. 1 (edit. 2008): 20'

Choir (voice) and orchestra
 2020 "Warm Prayer" version for voice and Strings
 2016 "Poverty" for voices and chamber orchestra on verses by Z. Mirkina
 2016 "Sophia" for soprano, choir and chamber orchestra on canonical text
 2016 "Lulling the Earth" chamber symphony for soloists, strings, singing bowls and stones
 2016 «Nebensonnen», cantata on the verses by Arnold Spescha for soprano and chamber orchestra: 17'
 2014 "Martyrology", vocals for voice and strings
 2014 "The Melting Voice" on the verses by J. Milton, version for improvising voice, flute and strings
 2009 «Ode an die Freude» Ode to Joy,on the verses by F. Schiller for soprano, mixed choir and symphony orchestra: 12'
 2009 "Credo" on canonical text, version for mixed choir and symphony orchestra: 10'
 2008 "Summer music", chamber cantata on the verses by J. Brodsky for violin solo, children choir and Strings: 12'
 2006 "No man is an Island", chamber cantata on the text by J. Donne for mezzo (women's choir), piano and Strings: 14'
 2002 "Word" on the text by Symeon the New Theologian for soprano, mixed choir and symphony orchestra: 16'
 2002 "Of Thee rejoice" on canonical text for mixed choir and chamber orchestra: 8'
 1995 "Gentle light", on canonical text for soprano, mixed choir and chamber orchestra: 12'
 1994 "Horace's ode",on the text by Quintus Horatius Flaccus for contratenor (alto), chamber choir and chamber orchestra: 12'
 1994 "Eleven lines from Glanvill", on the text by J. Glanvill for voice, mixed choir and chamber ensemble: 11'
 1991 "Klage II", on the verses by R.M. Rilke for soprano and chamber orchestra: 5'
 1986-1993 "Missa-simphonia" on canonical texts for children's choir and chamber orchestra (edit. 2009): 35'

Mixed choir a cappella
 2022 "David's Psalm 50" version for soloists and mixed choir
 2022 "David's Psalm 91" for soloists and two mixed choirs
 2021 "David's Psalm 22" version for soloists and two mixed choirs 
 2020 "David's Psalm 3" for soloists and two choirs
 2019 "David's Psalm 2" for soloists and two choirs
 2018 "David's Psalm 1" for mixed choir
 2016 "Luminous canticles", symphony on canonical text for soloists and mixed choir: 45'
 2013 "Liturgy" on canonical texts for soloists and mixed choirs: 45'
 2010 "Offering to reverend Alipy of the Caves on canonical text: 3'
 2010 "God's chosen regiment" on canonical text: 4'
 2009 "Christ is risen", сycle on canonical text: 10'
 2009 "Christmas Kontakion II" ("Today the Virgin") on the text by Romanos the Melodist: 2'
 2008 "Credo" on canonical text for 2 mixed choirs: 7'
 2007 "Dio laudemo" on the verses by Dante Alighieri: 8'
 2006 Troparion of the "Life-giving Spring" Church: 2'
 2005 "St.Ephrem the Syrian's prayer" on the text by Ephrem the Syrian: 3'
 2004 "Christmas Kontakion I" ("Today the Virgin")for alto and mixed choir on the text by Romanos the Melodist: 4'
 2003 "In the river the abyss" on canonical text: 5'
 2003 "Mother of Light", triptych on canonical texts: 8'
 2003 "Beatitudes" on canonical text: 6'
 2003 "Offertory to Arvo Pärt", triptych on canonical texts for soloists and mixed choir: 20'
 2001 "Hymn to the Theotokos" ("The Angel Cried") on canonical texts for soprano and mixed choir: 5'
 2000 "Psalm 50" of David: 12'
 1997 "Prayers for the alive" on canonical text: 6'
 1985 "Wind with forest talks" on the verses by T. Shevchenko: 7'

Women's choir a cappella
 2013 "Liturgy of John Chrysostom" on canonical texts
 2013 "Evening singing" on canonical texts
 2013 "All the angels of the host" on the canonical text
 2012 "Song of St. Silouan" to the text of Silouan the Athos
 2009 "Prostopenie" on canonical texts for soprano and women's choir
 2008 "Song of silence" on the text by O. Chysta: 1'
 2007 "Resurrection Stikhere" on canonical text for soprano and women's choir: 2'
 2007 "Magnification of Christmas" on canonical text: 3'
 2007 "Christmas Troparion" on canonical text: 4'
 2007 "O fervent prayer" on canonical text for soprano and women's choir: 4'
 2005 "Silouan's prayer" on the text by Silouan the Athonite  for soprano and women's choir: 3'
 2005 "All-Holy Trinity" on canonical text for soprano and women's choir: 3'
 2002 "Solfeggio": 1'
 2001 "Psalm 22" of David for soprano and women's choir: 7'
 2001 "Theotokos' canticles", triptych on canonical texts for soprano and women's choir: 8'
 1998 "Canticles", cycle on canonical texts for soprano and women's choir: 20'
 1996 "Sugrevushka" on folk text for soprano and women's choir: 8'

Men's choir a cappella
 2001 "Simeon's word" on the text by Symeon the New Theologian (version for men's choir): 10'
 1999 "Men's canticles", cycle on canonical texts for tenor and men's choir: 14'

Children's choir a cappella
 2002 "Evening singing", diptych on canonical texts for boy's choir: 3'
 2000 "Gold from the sky" on the verses by A. Fet: 1'
 1999 "Cherubic chant", triptych on canonical texts: 6'
 1991 "Little lullabies", triptych on folk texts: 6'

Chamber orchestra
 2022 "Passacaglia" for Violin solo and Strings
 2021 "Soul" for Violin solo and chamber orchestra
 2019 "Winter's Tale" for chamber orchestra
 2014 "Marginalia", version for vibraphone and string orchestra
 2009 "Messages to one simple man" for violin (flute), vibraphone and strings
 2008 "Capriccio for John Balzer" for bassoon and strings
 2006 "Pieta" for Violin solo and strings
 2006 "Lullaby for the sleeping" for vibraphone (piano) and strings (edit. 2010): 7'
 2006 "Nenia" (version for Violin solo and Strings): 15'
 2005-2006 "Cricket in the darkness" for flute, clarinet and Strings: 9'
 2005 "Warm wind" for violin (violin, vibraphone) and Strings: 3'
 2002 "White interment" for oboe and Strings: 14'
 1994 "Langsam" (version for Strings): 16'
 1991 "Anthem I" for Strings, piano and bells: 7'
 1986 Music for flute, Strings and percussion: 11'

Chamber ensemble
 2022 "Amapola" for violin, cello and piano (dedicated to Gidon Kremer)
 2021 "Simurg" version for 2 pianos
 2020 "Donkeys" version for voice and chamber ensemble
 2020 "Eter" for voice, cello and piano
 2020 "Metta" version for violin and guitar
 2020 "Sermon to the Fishes" for piano and chamber ensemble 
 2019-20 "Tanka" for cello and piano
 2011-19 "Walking on the waters" for piano and chamber ensemble
 2017-19 "Angelsang" for 2 violins and piano
 2004-19 «Underground Birds", suite on own text for marimba, voice and oboe
 2017 "Music for Temo" for chamber ensemble
 2017 "Warm Wind" (version for 2 harpsichords)
 2016 "Seraph Smile" for flute and chamber ensemble
 2013 "Poverty" version for two voices and chamber ensemble on the verses of Z. Mirkina
 2013 "Walking on the Waters" for string quartet
 2013 "Blind hand 2" for singing button accordion and whistling theremin (or cello)
 2013 "In Hannover" for voice and chamber ensemble
 2012 "Poverty" for guitar choir on verses by Z. Mirkina
 2012 "Abbitte" (Atonement) for voice, clarinet, accordion and cello on verses by F. Hölderlin
 2011 "Liebesbotschaft" (Offering to Schubert) for violin and piano
 2010 "Gulfstream" for violin and cello (two cellos)
 2008 "The Song Never Ends" for two harpsichords (two pianos)
 2007 "Magic square" for flute, clarinet, violin, viola, cello and piano: 3'
 2006 "Blind hand" for flute and guitar: 8'
 2005 "Voice" for 2 violoncellos: 8'
 2005 "Here", song cycle on the verses by G. Aygi for soprano, violin and piano: 4'
 2004 "Underground birds", suite on an own text for soprano, corno inglese and theorbo: 10'
 2002 "Songs of Innocence and of Experience", song cycle on the verses by W. Blake for soprano, clarinet, accordion: 13'
 2000 "Simurgh-quintet" for 2 violins, viola, violoncello and piano: 15'
 1999 "Echos" ("ἦχος"), cheerful drama with music on an own text for soprano, violin, piano and accordion: 6'
 1998 "Mystery" for piano, trombone, double bass and vibraphone: 9'
 1995 "Еpiphany" on an own text for soprano and chamber ensemble: 10'
 1995 "Magic doggy Petit-Kru" for free formation of performers and tape: 7'
 1994 "Klage III" on the verses by R.M. Rilke for soprano, flute and piano quintet: 4'
 1994 Music for a Scene from "Hamlet" on the text by W. Shakespeare (version for soprano, violin, trombone and piano): 5'
 1993 "Walking in emptiness" for flute, clarinet, violin, cello, piano and percussion: 15'
 1989 Trio "5×3" for flute, violin and piano: 7'

Voice and piano (another instrument)
 2020 "Eter" for voice, cello and piano
 2014 "Poor people" for soprano and piano, lyrics by O. Sedakova
 2013 "More Tender than Tender" for soprano and piano on verses by O. Mandelstam
 2012 "Abbitte" (Atonement) for voice and piano by F. Hölderlin
 2012-1982 "Ars Amandi" ("The Art of Loving") for soprano and piano
 1983-2012 "Ars moriendi", 18 monologues about death for soprano and piano: 35'
 2008 "No Man Is an Island" on the text by J. Donne (version for soprano and piano): 14'
 2007 "The Sea of Faith" on the verses by M. Arnold for soprano and piano: 8'
 2003 "Slouan's psalm" on the text by Silouan the Athonite for soprano and violoncello (piano): 11'
 2000 "Simeon's word" on the text by Symeon the New Theologian for soprano and organ: 10'
 1998 "It was radiated night" on the verses by A. Fet for voice and piano: 8'
 1995 "Green grass bunnies" on verses by M. Vorobjov for reciter and piano: 10'
 1991 "Song" on the verses by J. Brodsky for voice and violoncello (piano): 6'
 1989 "Scene from "Hamlet" on the text by W. Shakespeare for soprano and piano: 5'
 1988 "Klage I" on the verses by R.M. Rilke for soprano and piano: 4'
 1983 "Silentium" on the verses by O. Mandelstam for voice and piano: 8'
 1982 "Bestiary", suite on the verses by B. Zakhoder for soprano (children's choir) and piano: 4'
 1981 "Canticle of the tree" on the verses by H. Poświatowska for voice and piano: 8'

Piano
 2021 "Simurgh" version for piano(for two pianos)
 2021 "Marginalia", a cycle of 10 pieces for piano
 2020 "Ischia. Island" for piano
 2017 "NULL" for piano
 2011 "Vitruvian Man" for piano
 2011 Sonata No. 2 «Quasi una Fantasia»: 10'
 2008-1998 "Marginalia", cycle for piano: 20'
 1999 "Serene-sonata": 18'
 1996 "Numbers", cycle for piano: 22'
 1993 «Trivium»: 9'
 1990 "Tremolo": 7'
 1982 "Passacaglia": 4'

Instrument solo
 2021 "Miro" for violin solo
 2008 "Warm wind" (version for marimba): 3'
 2005 "Null" for button accordion (organ): 9'

Electroacoustics
 2004 "Rooms of the Turbin's house", electroacoustic installation: 37'

Transcriptions
2012 J.S. Bach. Goldberg Variations  for violin, marimba, vibraphone, cembalo and violoncello 
2012 L.Revutsky String quartet N1  reconstruction and orchestration for 2 violins, viola and violoncello
2011 H.Vieuxtemps op.39 Duo brillant  reconstruction and orchestration for violin, violoncello and chamber orchestra
2010 J.S. Bach. Prelude and Fugue No. 14 fis-moll, WТC II  for violin, marimba, cembalo and String orchestra (ensemble): 7'
2005 H.I.F Biber Sonata-Representativa for violin and Strings: 14'

External links

References 

 Official site 
 
 
 Page on the web-site of Ukrainian National Composers's Union
 KREMERATA BALTICA by Stanley Fefferman
 Victoria Poleva, Kiev-Ucrania (portrait)
 Interview for newspaper «Day» (2009)
 Interview for newspaper «Capital news» (2004)
 Interview for newspaper «Day» (2002)
 Виктория Полевая. «Доверься тишине... Восемь мгновений с Валентином Сильвестровым»
 Дмитрий Десятерик. «Безупречный вечер»
 Виталий Сидоркин. «Богородицу и Матерь Света в песнях возвеличим»
 from the Classical Discoveries website

Ukrainian classical composers
Soviet composers
20th-century classical composers
Women classical composers
1962 births
Living people
Musicians from Kyiv
20th-century women composers